Imogen Clark (born 1 June 1999) is a British swimmer.

She competed in the 50 m breaststroke event at the 2018 European Aquatics Championships, winning the silver medal.

International Swimming League 
In the Autumn of 2019 she was member of the inaugural International Swimming League swimming for Energy Standard, who won the team title in Las Vegas, Nevada, in December.

References

External links

1999 births
Living people
Sportspeople from Chesterfield, Derbyshire
British female swimmers
Female breaststroke swimmers
European Aquatics Championships medalists in swimming
Swimmers at the 2022 Commonwealth Games
Commonwealth Games medallists in swimming
Commonwealth Games silver medallists for England
21st-century British women
Medallists at the 2022 Commonwealth Games